Definitive Collection is a greatest hits album by Tony Christie. It was released by Universal Music TV in 2005 and peaked at number one on the UK Albums Chart.

The album had two singles, "(Is This the Way to) Amarillo" and "Avenues and Alleyways", reached Number 1 and number 26 respectively in the UK singles chart in 2005.

Track listing 
(Is This the Way to) Amarillo
Avenues and Alleyways
Las Vegas
Solitaire
Happy Birthday Baby
I Did What I Did for Maria
Drive Safely Darlin'
On This Night of a Thousand Stars
Daddy Don't You Walk So Fast
Most Beautiful Girl
Don't Go Down to Reno
The Way We Were
So Deep Is the Night
Didn't We
You've Lost That Lovin' Feelin'
Home Lovin' Man
Walk like a Panther (All Seeing I feat. Tony Christie)
Vienna Sunday
Loving You
Almost in Love
A Street of Broken Dreams

Charts

Weekly charts

Year-end charts

References

Tony Christie albums
2005 greatest hits albums